Independence Monument is a 5,739-foot-elevation (1,749 meter) sandstone pillar located in Colorado National Monument, in Mesa County of western Colorado, United States. It is a popular climbing destination, and can be seen from Rim Rock Drive.

History

John Otto first arrived in the Grand Junction area in 1906. He lived alone in the canyons and used a pick and shovel to carve out trails. Otto is remembered as Colorado National Monument's founder, and its first custodian. A fervent patriot, he named the rock features after great heroes and historic events, with Independence Monument still bearing the name he bestowed. John Otto made the first ascent of Independence Monument on June 14, 1911, flying Old Glory from the summit for Flag Day. That flag was presented to Otto by President William Howard Taft. Subsequently, he would make the ascent on July 4 each year to again display the flag to celebrate Independence Day. But it wasn't climbing as is commonly practiced today. His method involved drilling holes and pounding in pieces of pipe to create a ladder. The pipes Otto attached were removed in the mid-1950s by the Park Service, but handholds and steps which he carved into the sandstone remain. John Otto married Boston artist Beatrice Farnham on June 20, 1911, at the base of Independence Monument in Wedding Canyon.

It has become an annual tradition among climbers to raise the flag on the summit on July 4th  each year.

Climbing
Established rock climbing routes on Independence Monument:

 Otto's Route  –  – 5 pitches – First Ascent 1911 (by John Otto)
 Independence Chimney  – class 5.8 – 6 pitches – FA 1970 (by Mike Dudley and Fletcher Smith)
 South Face Direct – class 5.9 – 5 pitches – FA 1971 (by Mike Dudley, Art Howells, Don Doucette)
 Sundial Dihedral – class 5.11b – 6 pitches – FA 1986 (by Ed Webster and Peter Athans)
 Dependence – class 5.10+ – 5 pitches – FA 1994 (by Jon Butler, Cam Burns, and Luke Laeser)
 Geezer Highway  – class 5.9+ – 6 pitches (by Mike Dudley and Dennis Willis)

Geology
This monolith is the remnant of a differentially eroded fin composed primarily of cliff-forming Wingate Sandstone, which consists of wind-borne, cross-bedded quartzose sandstones deposited as ancient sand dunes approximately 200 million years ago in the Late Triassic. The thin caprock at the summit consists of fluvial sandstones of the resistant Kayenta Formation. The slope around the base of the Independence Monument is Chinle Formation. The floor of the canyon is Precambrian basement rock consisting of gneiss, schist, and granites. Precipitation runoff from this geographical feature drains to the Colorado River, approximately two miles to the northeast.

Climate
According to the Köppen climate classification system, Independence Monument is located in a semi-arid climate zone. Summers are hot and dry, while winters are cold with some snow. Temperatures reach  on 5.3 days,  on 57 days, and remain at or below freezing on 13 days annually. The months April through October offer the most favorable weather to visit.

Gallery

See also
 List of rock formations in the United States
 Kissing Couple
 Pipe Organ
 Grand View Spire

References

External links
 Weather forecast: National Weather Service
 Independence Monument rock climbing: Mountainproject.com
 Climbing Otto's Route video: YouTube
 Independence Day Tradition: National Park Service

Colorado Plateau
Landforms of Mesa County, Colorado
Colorado National Monument
Buttes of Colorado
North American 1000 m summits
Sandstone formations of the United States
Climbing areas of the United States
Rock formations of Colorado
Geologic formations with imbedded sand dunes
Climbing areas of Colorado